Ethan Paquin (born ) is an American poet and a native of New Hampshire.

Biography
A member of the I-90 school of poets, Ethan Paquin grew up in Londonderry, New Hampshire. He earned a BA in English/writing from Plymouth State University in Plymouth, New Hampshire, and his MFA in creative writing from the MFA Program for Poets & Writers, University of Massachusetts Amherst. He is founding editor of the online literary journal Slope, which he launched in 1999, and co-founded with Christopher Janke the nonprofit poetry press Slope Editions in 2001. He previously taught at Plymouth State University, the University of Massachusetts Lowell, Medaille College in Buffalo, New York, and in the writing program at the University of Massachusetts Amherst. Ethan presently lives in Rural Mississippi.

Selected publications

Books
 Cloud vs. Cloud (Ahsahta Press, 2013)
 My Thieves (Salt Publishing, 2007)
 The Violence (Ahsahta Press, 2005), runner-up for the 2005 Poetry Society of America William Carlos Williams Award
 Accumulus (Salt Publishing, 2003)
 The Makeshift (Stride Publications, 2002) (published in England)

Chapbooks
 Deafening Leafening (Pilot Books, 2009) with Matt Hart
 Nineains (Hand Held Editions, 2008)

Other publications
His writing has been published in journals including Colorado Review, Fence, Verse, The Boston Review, Boulevard, New American Writing, Quarterly West, Pleiades, Esquire, Jacket (Australia), and Meanjin (Australia). His literary criticism has appeared in journals including The Boston Review, Verse, Canadian Review of Books and Contemporary Poetry Review.

Reviews
Paquin's books have been reviewed in publications including The Times Literary Supplement, Poetry Review, PN Review, New Review of Literature, and Publishers Weekly.

Anthologies
Paquin's poetry has been included in:
Legitimate Dangers: American Poets of the New Century (Sarabande Books, 2005)
Isn't It Romantic: 100 Love Poems by Younger American Poets (Wave Books, 2002)
French Connections: A Gathering of Franco-American Poets (Louisiana Literature Press, 2006)
Joyful Noise: An Anthology of American Spiritual Poetry (Autumn House Press, 2007)

References

External links
 Slope (journal of international poetry)
 Slope Editions

Living people
American people of French-Canadian descent
American male poets
Plymouth State University alumni
University of Massachusetts Amherst MFA Program for Poets & Writers alumni
University of Massachusetts Amherst faculty
People from Londonderry, New Hampshire
Year of birth missing (living people)